WFKZ (103.1 FM) is a radio station broadcasting a classic rock format which is also simulcasted on 99.5 WAIL which is licensed to Key West, Florida. Licensed to Plantation Key, Florida, United States, the station serves the Florida Keys area.  The station is currently owned by Robert Holladay, through licensee Florida Keys Media, LLC, and features programming from AP Radio.

On January 25, 2008, it was announced that WFKZ was one of several Clear Channel radio stations to be sold, in order to remain under the ownership caps following the sale of Clear Channel to private investors. Until it was sold, WFKZ and other stations, to be sold, were placed into the Aloha Stations Trust.

The trust sold WFKZ and three sister stations to Robert Holladay's Florida Keys Media, LLC for $650,000; the transaction was consummated February 28, 2014.

References

External links

FKZ
Classic rock radio stations in the United States
1984 establishments in Florida
Radio stations established in 1984